Athletics in France is governed by Fédération française d'athlétisme founded on 20 November 1920.

World records

All-time top lists

The lists are updated to 22 February 2013, and regards to the 21 individuals Olympic specialities. For high jump, pole vault, long jump, triple jump and shot put performance also affects indoor competitions (measures are identified by (i) in the tables).

Pole vault

Men

Women

See also
Fédération française d'athlétisme
French records in athletics

References

External links
Fédération française d'athlétisme official site

 
France
Athletics